Parowan Valley, originally known as the Little Salt Lake Valley, is a basin in Iron County, Utah, United States.

Description

Fremont Wash, Red Creek, Parowan Creek and other tributaries all drain into the Little Salt Lake.  In times that the lake overflows it is drained through the Parowan Gap that passes through the Red Hills into Jackrabbit Wash, in Cedar Valley.

See also

 List of valleys of Utah

References

External links

 Petroglyph day; interpretations and mysteries of Parowan Gap, St. George News, June 16, 2019

Valleys of Iron County, Utah
Valleys of Utah